The Bridge of Souls or Bridge of Souls may refer to:

Religion
 Chinvat Bridge, a metaphysical term in Zoroastrianism

Literature
 Bridge of Souls (book), a 2004 novel by Fiona McIntosh